Universidad Católica de Murcia Club de Fútbol, commonly known as UCAM Murcia or simply UCAM, is a Spanish football club based in Murcia. Founded in 1999 it plays in Segunda Federación, holding home games at Estadio de La Condomina, with a capacity of 6,500 spectators.

History

Universidad Católica San Antonio de Murcia Club de Fútbol  was founded in 1999 and had previously a team which played in Tercera División from 2000 to 2005. In parallel was founded in 2004 the Club de Fútbol Los Garres, making its first appearance in Tercera División in 2008–09 as Murcia Deportivo Club de Fútbol. In 2009 a businessman from Beniaján, Murcia, acquired the club and moved it to his local town; one year later the club relocated again, now to Sangonera la Verde, and, in 2011, UCAM became its new owner.

At the end of the 2011–12 season, after Orihuela suffered relegation from Segunda División B due to irregularities, UCAM Murcia took its place. After suffering relegation, the club bounced back to the third level immediately, and achieved a respectable second place in his group during the 2014–15 campaign; it missed out promotion in the play-offs, after being knocked out by Bilbao Athletic B, which would later achieve promotion.

In the 2015–16 season, UCAM Murcia finished the regular season as champions of the Group 4, six points ahead of neighbours Real Murcia. The club achieved the promotion to Segunda División in the play-offs after beating Real Madrid Castilla 4–3 on aggregate.

The first season of UCAM in the second flight would be short-lived, as they ended in the 19th position, and subsequently relegated to the third tier, after being defeated in a do-or-die game by Gimnàstic de Tarragona in the last matchday. In the 2018-19 season the club finished 5th with 66 points in the Segunda División B, Group 4.

Club names
Murcia Deportivo Club de Fútbol (1999-2005)
Murcia Deportivo-Rincón de Seca Club de Fútbol (2007-2008)
Murcia Deportivo Club de Fútbol-UCAM (2008-2009)
Costa Cálida-Beniaján Club de Fútbol (2009-2010)
Costa Cálida-Sangonera Club de Fútbol (2010-2011)
UCAM Murcia Club de Fútbol (2011-2015)
UCAM Universidad Católica de Murcia Club de Fútbol (2015-)

Season to season

New UCAM Murcia CF

1 season in Segunda División
1 season in Primera División RFEF
7 seasons in Segunda División B
8 seasons in Tercera División

Support 
UCAM Murcia’s highest home attendance is 5,877, in a 2016–17 Segunda División match against Rayo Vallecano. The club’s two main supporters groups are Los T-UCAM who were founded in 2015 and Los Blue Gold who were founded in 2016.

Current squad

Reserve team

Out on loan

Honours
Segunda División B (1): 2015–16
Tercera División (2): 2010–11, 2013–14

Coaches
 Luis Tevenet (2012–13)
 Gabriel Correa (2013–14)
 Eloy Jiménez (2014–15)
 José María Salmerón (2015–16)
 Francisco (2016–17)
 Lluís Planagumà (2017)
 José Miguel Campos (2017–2018)
 Pedro Munitis (2018–2019)
 Juan Merino (2019)
 Rubén Albés (2019)
 Miguel Rivera (2019–2020)
 Sergio Aracil (2020)
 Asier Santana (2020)
 José María Salmerón (2020–present)

References

External links
Official website 
Futbolme team profile 
Trecera profile 

 
Football clubs in the Region of Murcia
Association football clubs established in 1999
1999 establishments in Spain
Sport in Murcia
University and college association football clubs in Spain
Segunda División clubs
Primera Federación clubs